The Scout and Guide movement in Brazil is served by:

 Federação de Bandeirantes do Brasil (Girl Guide Federation of Brazil), member of the World Association of Girl Guides and Girl Scouts
 União dos Escoteiros do Brasil (Union of Brazilian Scouts), member of the World Organization of the Scout Movement
 Associação Escoteira Baden-Powell, provisional member of the World Federation of Independent Scouts 
 Clube de Desbravadores do Brasil, affiliated to Pathfinders

External links
Federação de Bandeirantes do Brasil 
União dos Escoteiros do Brasil 
Associação Escoteira Baden-Powell